filmarchives online is a web gateway providing easy access to moving image collections from various European film archives. It allows the search throughout a growing number of individual archival databases. Since February 2007, catalogue information on around 25.000 film works – mainly non-fiction material – is searchable in various languages – among them English, German, French, Italian, and Czech. The database is constantly growing. Where available, streaming videos and screenshots are provided with the respective film work entry. 

As locating moving images often is a complex, time consuming, and costly process, filmarchives online aims at simplifying the access and distribution of archival films in Europe. The portal addresses user groups ranging from the professional media and film production domain to the area of scientific research. Moving images can be searched by content, filmographic data and physical characteristics. Search results provide available information about existence and location of the materials. In addition to the search function, the website provides contact information to facilitate the access to the moving image items and, if available, links to digital content available for online viewing.

filmarchives online is the result of the MIDAS project (Moving Image Database for Access and Re-use of European Film Collections). MIDAS was initiated in January 2006 as a pilot project in the MEDIA Programme of the European Commission and ended in January 2009. It was coordinated by the Deutsches Filminstitut together with other institutions dedicated to collecting and preserving the European film heritage. The consortium comprises eighteen institutions – among them the British Film Institute, Národní Filmový Archiv (Prague), the Cinémathèque Royale de Belgique (Brussels) and the DEFA Foundation.

External links 
filmarchives-online.eu - Web Gateway
MIDAS Project (Moving Image Database for Access and Re-use of European Film Collections) - Project Information
EFG - The European Film Gateway  - Project website
Europeana.eu  - Web Gateway

German film websites
Film archives in Germany
Online film databases